The women's national under-19 basketball team of the Philippines represents the country in junior women's under-18 and under-19 FIBA tournaments.

Current roster
Philippines roster at the 2022 FIBA U18 Women's Asian Championship.

Past rosters

2010 FIBA Asia Under-18 Championship for Women: finished 9th among 12 teams

Danica Therese Jose (Ateneo), Trisha Angela Dy (UST), Camille Claro (La Salle), Elrica Aniela Castro (Ateneo), Jacqueline Tanaman (FEU), Lore Rivera (UST), Marie Claire Therese Aseron (Ateneo), Regina Marie Pioquinto (UP), Maria Rosario Franchesca Tantoco (Ateneo), Nelia Sincioco,  Alyanna Francesca Nitorreda (Ateneo), Alyanna Sabrina Ong (La Salle)

2008 FIBA Asia Under-18 Championship for Women: finished 8th among 12 teams

Katherine Sandel (Captain, G, Adamson), Carmina Laguindanum (C, NU), Fria Bernardo (G, Adamson), Allalaine De Gomas (G, La Salle-Dasmariñas), Angelica Ortega (F, Adamson), Marilourd Socorro Borja (G, FEU), Mary Joy Leviste (C, FEU), Cindy Resultay (F, UE), Agatha Marie Astrero (F, FEU), Khaterine Mangahas (F, Adamson), Ana Versoza (C, Adamson), Raiza Rose Palmera (F, FEU)

References

External links
Samahang Basketbol ng Pilipinas Official Website

under
Women's national under-19 basketball teams